Cirrus vertebratus is a type of cirrus cloud. The name cirrus vertebratus is derived from Latin, meaning "jointed, articulated, vertebrated". Like cirrus intortus, the vertebratus species is exclusive to the cirrus genus. Cirrus vertebratus gives the impression of vertebrae in a spinal column, ribs, or a fish skeleton.

The species is an unusual form of cirrus clouds and is formed by air moving parallel to the main cloud line. The gaps in the cloud occur where air is descending, while the "ribs" of the cloud correspond with areas of uplift. Their occurrence appears to be connected with the location of the jet stream.

See also
List of cloud types

References

External links
International Cloud Atlas – Cirrus vertebratus

Cirrus